The men's javelin throw event was part of the track and field athletics programme at the 1924 Summer Olympics. The competition was held on Sunday, July 6, 1924. 29 javelin throwers from 15 nations competed.

Records
These were the standing world and Olympic records (in metres) prior to the 1924 Summer Olympics.

Results

Qualification

The qualification started at about 3 p.m. The best six throwers, both groups counted together, qualified for the final. The throwing order is not available and not all throwing series are available.

Group 1

Group 2

Final
The final was held on the same day and started at about 4.30 p.m.

References

Sources
 Olympic Report
 

Men's javelin throw
Javelin throw at the Olympics